Saint Cornelius is the name of the following saints and persons in the previous stages of liturgical veneration:

 Pope Cornelius (in office: 251–253)
 Cornelius of Armagh (d. 1175)

May 19 (Eastern Orthodox liturgics)

 Venerable Cornelius of Komel (Vologda), abbot (1537) 
 Saint Cornelius of Paleostrov, abbot (15th century) 

July 22 (Eastern Orthodox liturgics)

 Saint Cornelius of Pereyaslavl, monk (1693) 

September 13 (Eastern Orthodox liturgics)

 Hieromartyr Cornelius the Centurion (1st century) 
 Saint Cornelius of Padan-Olonets and with him Saints Dionysius and Misail 

List of Patriarchs of Antioch

 St. Ignatius the Illuminator (68–107) 
 Saint Cornelius (127–154)